In a cellular automaton, a finite pattern is called a spaceship if it reappears after a certain number of generations in the same orientation but in a different position. The smallest such number of generations is called the period of the spaceship.

Description
The speed of a spaceship is often expressed in terms of c, the metaphorical speed of light (one cell per generation) which in many cellular automata is the fastest that an effect can spread. More generally, if a spaceship in a 2D automaton with the Moore neighborhood is translated by  after  generations, then the speed  is defined as:

This notation can be readily generalised to cellular automata with dimensionality other than two.

A pullalong is a pattern that is not a spaceship in itself but that can be attached to the back of a spaceship to form a larger spaceship. Similarly, a pushalong is placed at the front. The term tagalong can refer to either of these patterns or a pattern that can be placed at the side of a spaceship to form a larger spaceship.

A pattern that, when a spaceship is input, outputs a copy of the spaceship travelling in a different direction is called a reflector. If the output is instead a different spaceship, the pattern is known as a converter.

Spaceships are important because they can sometimes be modified to produce puffers. Spaceships can also be used to transmit information. For example, in Conway's Game of Life, the ability of the glider (Life's simplest spaceship) to transmit information is part of a proof that Life is Turing-complete.

In March 2016, the unexpected discovery of a small but high-period spaceship enthused the Game of Life community. It was named "copperhead". A similar example, called "loafer", was found a few years earlier.

In March 2018, the first elementary spaceship with displacement (2,1) (knightwise) was discovered and named Sir Robin.

References

External links
 Spaceships in Conway's Game of Life by David I. Bell
 Gliders in "Life"-Like Cellular Automata by David Eppstein

Cellular automaton patterns